Tangata may refer to:

 Tangata (spider), a genus of spiders in the family Orsolobidae
 Tangata whenua
 Tangata manu
 Adam Tangata (born 1991), Cook Islands professional rugby league footballer
 Tangata Vavia (born 1949)